Hayko Mko Blo Ամենաստացված եռյակը պատմության մեջ() was an Armenian comedian duo made up of Hayk Marutyan  (known as Hayko) and Mkrtich Arzumanyan (known as Mko). They are best known from Kargin Haghordum and Kargin Serial, two popular comedy shows starring Hayko and Mko as main actors. Currently, they do not work together.

Early years

Hayko

Hayko is Hayk Marutyan, born 18 December 1976, Yerevan). From first through 7th grade, he went to the School #83 and continued his education in Anania Shirakatsi Seminary, where he spent his 8th, 9th and 10th grades. From 1992-1997, he went to the State Engineering University. From 1995-2002, he was a member of the Armenian Project KVN team of the same university. Hayko worked for Sharm Holding from 1996 to 2002 as a scriptwriter, director. As an actor, he played in 220 Volt (1996), Valyur (1996), Our Yard (1996), Our Yard 2 (1998), Tuyn Kaset (2000), Urish Kaset (2000), Banda (2000), and Komertsion Nerkayatsum (2001). He was the Mayor of Yerevan, having been elected in 2018 and served until 2021.

Mko

Mko is Mkrtich Arzumanyan (born 10 August 1976, Gyumri). He went to School #23 and School #14 of Gyumri. From 1992-97, he went to the Gyumri branch of the State Engineering University. From 1995-1996, he played in universities, from 1997-2002, in the 'Armenian Project' KVN team. In 2002, Mko was included in the 21st century team of KVN and participated in a jubilee game in Moscow. 

Mko worked for Sharm Holding from 1996 to 2002 as a scriptwriter. As an actor, he played in 220 Volt (1996), Valyur (1996), Our Yard (1996), Our Yard 2 (1998), Tuyn Kaset (2000), Urish Kaset (2000), and Banda (2000).

The duo became very well-known with Kargin Haghordum (Cool Program)  that had a seven-year run from 2002 to 2009 as an Armenian comedy TV show airing in Armenia on the Armenia TV channel. It was one of the most popular and successful comedy shows in post-independent Armenian history.

Works
1996: 220 Volt
1996: Vaylur
1997: Our Yard
1998: Our Yard 2
2000: Tuyn Kaset
2000: Urish Kaset
2000: Banda
2002-2009: Kargin Haghordum
2007, 2008, 2009: 7.5 (in 2009, with 32 Atam), theatrical performance
2007-2009: Kargin Multer 
2010-2013: Kargin Serial 
2011: Alabalanica
2011: No Comment, theatrical performance
2013-2015: Tnpesa (Mko only)
2013: The Knight's Move (Mko only)
2014: Super Mother (Hayko only)
2015: Love Odd (Hayko only)
2015: North-South (Mko only)
2016: Run Away or Get Married (Mko only)
2016-2020: The Azizyans (Hayko only)
2017: Super Mother 2 (Hayko only)
2018: Agent 044 (Mko only)

References

1976 births
Living people
Armenian male film actors
Comedy duos
Comedy theatre characters
Comedy film characters
Comedy television characters
20th-century Armenian male actors
21st-century Armenian male actors
Armenian male stage actors